Jean Baptiste Édouard Montaubry (27 March 1824 – 12 February 1883) was a French violinist, conductor, tenor and composer.

He was the brother of the tenor Achille-Félix Montaubry (1826-1898).

Bibliography
 Erik Kocevar: "Jean-Baptiste-Édouard Montaubry", in Joël-Marie Fauquet (ed.): Dictionnaire de la musique en France au XIXe siècle (Paris: Fayard, 2003); .

1824 births
1883 deaths
19th-century French composers
19th-century French male singers
Conservatoire de Paris alumni
French conductors (music)
19th-century French male classical violinists
French operatic tenors
French male conductors (music)
People from Niort